Markus Kahma (born 16 October 1932) is a Finnish athlete. He competed in the men's decathlon at the 1960 Summer Olympics.

References

External links
 

1932 births
Living people
Athletes (track and field) at the 1960 Summer Olympics
Finnish decathletes
Olympic athletes of Finland
People from Alavieska
Sportspeople from North Ostrobothnia